Bitterness the Star is the debut major label album by American metalcore band 36 Crazyfists. It was released on April 4, 2002 through Roadrunner Records, and was produced by Eddie Wohl. "Slit Wrist Theory" was released as a single and is often censored to "Wrist Theory" on music channels to eliminate the self-harm reference. This is the only 36 Crazyfists album to bear a Parental Advisory sticker.

Singer Brock Lindow has stated that this release is his favorite 36 Crazyfists studio album. In an interview with the music magazine Kerrang! in 2007, he declared, "Bitterness will always remain my favourite album, no matter what".

Background
The majority of the songs were written in 1997–98, immediately after the release of the band's independent demo In the Skin.

Track listing

Tracks 15, 16 and 17 of the special edition are originally recorded on the '99 Demo.

Personnel

36 Crazyfists 
Brock Lindow – vocals
Steve Holt – guitar, backing vocals
Mick Whitney – bass
Thomas Noonan – drums

Guests 
Carl Severson – additional vocals on "One More Word"
Steev Esquivel – additional vocals on "Bury Me Where I Fall"

Production 
Eddie Wohl – producer, engineer, mixing
Rob Caggiano – producer, engineer, mixing
Steve Regina – producer, engineer, mixing
Paul Orofino – engineer
Ted Jensen – mastering
Tom Simpson – media
Monte Conner – A&R
Daniel Moss – photography
Brooke Fasani – live photos

References

36 Crazyfists albums
2002 albums
Roadrunner Records albums
Albums produced by Eddie Wohl